Grace Prestwich, née Milne (19 December 1832 – 31 August 1899), was a Scottish author and illustrator. She wrote fiction and popularizations of geology.

Life and works
Grace Anne Prestwich was born in Kinloss, Scotland on 19 December 1832; the botanist and paleontologist Dr. Hugh Falconer was her uncle and they corresponded extensively. She was sent away to boarding school at age six and was a good student. She learned to draw portraits during this time. She married the wine merchant George McCall on 18 October 1854 and gave him a son the following year. Her husband died from pneumonia on March 1856 and her son from hydrocephaly two months later. Shortly afterward, she took care of her uncle, Alexander Falconer, during his last days. Hugh Falconer invited her along on a long tour of Italy and France in September 1858, during which they met his friend, the science writer Mary Somerville, and she became his assistant, secretary and hostess until his death in 1865. Prestwich married the much older wine merchant and geologist, Joseph Prestwich, on 6 February 1870; they had no children.

Prestwich began writing during the 1870s, publishing two anonymous novels and a series of articles explaining geology in Every Girl's Magazine and Good Words. In these articles she laid out the history of geology and discussed the evidence for and against various hypotheses. She also wrote popular versions of at least two of her husband's scientific papers for Good Words. Prestwich later wrote several accounts of her travels with her uncle for other magazines. She died on 31 August 1899 after several years of ill-health.

She became an active member of the council of one of the first two women's colleges at the University of Oxford: Somerville Hall (later Somerville College), named after Mary Somerville.

Notes

References

1832 births
1899 deaths
British geologists
British writers
People associated with Somerville College, Oxford